Pencer is an unincorporated community in Mickinock Township, Roseau County, Minnesota, United States.

Notes

Unincorporated communities in Roseau County, Minnesota
Unincorporated communities in Minnesota